Nubar Pasha (January 1825 – 14 January 1899) was an Egyptian-Armenian politician and the first Prime Minister of Egypt. He served as Prime Minister three times during his career. His first term was between August 1878 and 23 February 1879. His second term was served from 10 January 1884 to 9 June 1888. His final term was between 16 April 1894 and 12 November 1895.

Early life
Nubar was born Nubar Nubarian in Smyrna in January 1825, the son of an Armenian merchant named Mgrdich, who had married a relative of Boghos Bey Yusufian, an influential minister of Muhammad Ali. Boghos Bey had promised to interest himself in the future of his young relative, and at his suggestion he was sent first to Vevey, and then to Toulouse, to be educated by the Jesuits, from whom he acquired an excellent command of the French language.

Khedival Secretary: 1843-1863
Before he was eighteen he went to Egypt, and after some eighteen months training as secretary to Boghos Bey, who was then minister of both commerce and foreign affairs, he was made second secretary to Muhammad Ali. In 1845 he became first secretary to Ibrahim Pasha, the heir apparent, and accompanied him on a special mission to Europe.

Abbas Pasha, who succeeded Ibrahim in 1848, maintained Nubar in the same capacity, and sent him in 1850 to London as his representative to resist the pretensions of the Ottoman sultan, who was seeking to evade the conditions of the treaty under which Egypt was secured to the family of Muhammad Ali. Here he was so completely successful that he was made a bey; in 1853 he was sent to Vienna on a similar mission, and remained there until the death of Abbas in July 1854.

The new viceroy, Said, at once dismissed him from office, but two years afterwards appointed him his chief secretary, and later gave him charge of the important transport service through Egypt to India. Here Nubar was mainly instrumental in the completion of railway communication between Cairo and Suez, and exhibited strong organising ability combined with readiness of resource. After a second time falling a victim to Said's caprice and being dismissed, he was again sent to Vienna, and returned as principal secretary to Said, a position he held till Said's death in January 1863.

On the accession of Ismail Pasha, Nubar Bey was in the prime of life. He was already on friendly terms with him; he even claimed to have saved his life — at all events, it was a coincidence that the two had together refused to travel by the train an accident to which caused the death (on 14 May 1858) of the prince Ahmed, who would otherwise have succeeded Said. Ismail, himself a more capable man than his immediate predecessors, at once recognized the ability of Nubar, and charged him with a mission to Constantinople, not only to notify his accession, but to smooth the way for the many ambitious projects he already entertained, notably the completion of the Suez Canal, the change in title to that of khedive and the change in the order of succession.

In the first of these he was completely successful; the sultan, believing as little as every one else that the canal was anything more than a dream, gave his consent at a price the moderation of which he must afterwards have regretted. The gratified Ismail created Nubar a pasha, and the sultan himself, persuaded to visit Cairo, confirmed the title so rarely accorded to a Christian. Half the work was, however, yet to be done, and Nubar was sent to Paris to complete the arrangements, and to settle the differences between Egypt and the Canal Company. In what he used to call an expensive moment of enthusiasm, he left these differences to the arbitration of the emperor Napoleon III and cost Egypt four million pounds sterling.

Cabinet Minister: 1864-1878
On his return he was made Egypt's first minister of public works, and was distinguished for the energy which he threw into the creation of a new department; but in 1866 he was made minister of foreign affairs, and at once went on a special mission to Constantinople, where he succeeded in the other two projects that had been left in abeyance since his last visit.

In June 1867 Ismail was declared khedive of Egypt, with succession in favor of his eldest son. Nubar now had a harder task to undertake than ever before. The antiquated system of capitulations which had existed in the Ottoman Empire since the 15th century had grown in Egypt to be a practical creation of seventeen imperia in imperio: seventeen consulates of seventeen different powers administered seventeen different codes in courts before which alone their subjects were amenable. A plaintiff could only sue a Frenchman in the French court, with appeal to Aix-en-Provence; an Italian in the Italian court, with appeal to Ancona; a Russian in the Russian court, with appeal to Moscow. Nubar's bold design, for which alone he deserves the credit, was to induce these seventeen powers to consent to abandon their jurisdiction in civil actions, to substitute mixed International Courts and a uniform code binding on all. That in spite of the jealousies of all the powers, in spite of the opposition of the Sublime Porte, he should have succeeded, places him at once in the first rank of statesmen of his period. Nubar made no attempt to get rid of the criminal jurisdiction exercised by the consular representatives of the foreign powers — such a proposal would have had, at that time, no chance of success.

Prime Minister: 1878-1879
The extravagant administration of Ismail, for which perhaps Nubar can hardly be held wholly responsible, had brought Egypt to the verge of bankruptcy, and Ismail's disregard of the judgments of the Court at last compelled Great Britain and France to interfere. Under pressure, Ismail, who began to regret the establishment of the International Courts, assented to a mixed ministry under Nubar, with Charles Rivers Wilson as minister of finance and the Marquis de Blignières as minister of public works. Nubar, finding himself supported by both Great Britain and France, tried to reduce Ismail to the position of a constitutional monarch, and Ismail, with an astuteness worthy of a better cause, took advantage of a somewhat injudicious disbandment of certain regiments to incite a military rising against the ministry. The governments of Great Britain and France, instead of supporting the ministry against the khedive, weakly consented to Nubar's dismissal; but when this was shortly followed by that of Rivers Wilson and de Blignières they realized that the situation was a critical one, and they succeeded in obtaining from the sultan the deposition of Ismail and the substitution of his son Tawfiq as khedive (1879). Nubar remained out of office until 1884.

Prime Minister: 1884 - 1888
In the interval Great Britain had intervened in Egypt — the battle of Tel al-Kebir had been fought, Urabi Pasha had been banished, and Sir Evelyn Baring (afterwards Lord Cromer) had succeeded Sir Edward Baldwin Malet. The British government, under the advice of Baring, insisted on the evacuation of the Sudan, and Muhammad Sharif Pasha having resigned office, the more pliant Nubar was induced to become prime minister, and to carry out a policy of which he openly disapproved, but which he considered Egypt was forced to accept under British dictation. At this period he used to say, "I am not here to govern Egypt, but to administer the British government of Egypt. I am simply the greaser of the official wheels."

It might have been well if Nubar had confined himself to this modest programme, but it was perhaps hardly to be expected of a man of his ability and restless energy. It must be admitted, however, that the characters of Nubar and Lord Cromer were not formed to run in harness, and it was with no surprise that the public learnt in June 1888 that he had been relieved of office, though his dismissal was the direct act of the khedive Tawfiq, who did not on this occasion seek the advice of the British agent.

Prime Minister: 1894-1895
Riyad Pasha, who succeeded him, was, with one interval of eight months, prime minister until April 1894, when Nubar returned to office. By that time Lord Cromer had more completely grasped the reins of administration as well as of government, and Nubar had realized more clearly the role which an Egyptian minister was called on to play: Lord Cromer was the real ruler of Egypt, and the death of Tawfiq in 1892 had necessitated a more open exercise of British authority.

In November 1895 Nubar completed his fifty years of service, and, accepting a pension, retired from office. He lived little more than three years longer, spending his time between Cairo and Paris, where he died in January 1899.

Legacy
Nubarashen, a suburb of Yerevan, was founded in 1930 with the help of Boghos Nubar, Nubar Pasha's son, and is named after Nubar Pasha.

References

See also 

 Armenians in Egypt

1825 births
1899 deaths
19th-century prime ministers of Egypt
People from İzmir
Egyptian people of Armenian descent
Smyrniote Armenians
Prime Ministers of Egypt
Foreign ministers of Egypt
Honorary Knights Grand Commander of the Order of the Star of India
Emigrants from the Ottoman Empire to Egypt
Honorary Knights Grand Cross of the Order of St Michael and St George
Grand Viziers of Egypt
Irrigation Ministers of Egypt